Texas senators may refer to:

 Members of the United States Senate representing the State of Texas
 Any member of the Texas Senate